Levante Ferries is a Greece-based ferry company which was established in 2014. Today, a fleet of four ferries serves the transportation needs of the islands Zakynthos, Cephalonia and Ithaca.

Routes
Currently, Levante Ferries is operating lines in Zante, Cephalonia and Ithaca islands. The company also operates a route between Thessaloniki and Izmir. The operating routes are:

Ionian Sea
 Zante-Killini-Zante (Mare Di Levante)
 Poros-Killini-Poros (Fior Di Levante)
 Sami-Ithaca-Sami-Patras-Sami-Ithaca-Sami (Andreas Kalvos)

Greece-Turkey
 Thessaloniki-Izmir (Smyrna Di Levante)

Current fleet

Future fleet

Notes 
 Fior Di Levante won the award for the integrity and creativity of the total design, both inside and outside, including the company branding at the 14th Annual Ferry Shipping Conference which was held on 13–15 April 2016.

 Fior Di Levante is the first ship in Greece that receives electricity at night from the shore based installation at the port of Kyllini.

 Mare Di Levante is the second ship of Levante Ferries. Before being bought by Levante Ferries it was called Ionian Star and it belonged to Tyrogalas ferries operating in the same routes as it does now.

 Andreas Kalvos is the third ship of Levante Ferries. Before being bought by Levante Ferries it belonged to Zante Ferries and was operating with the same name it has now.

 Kefalonia is the fourth ship of Levante Ferries. Before being bought by Levante Ferries it belonged to Kefalonian Lines. Kefalonia operated for more than 20 years in the route Patra-Sami-Ithaca which made it really favorable in the people of Kefalonia and Ithaca.

References

External links
https://www.levanteferries.com/

Ferry companies of Greece
Greek companies established in 2014
Transport companies established in 2014